Fiona McLaughlin is a senior Oceanographer, employed by Canada's Department of Fisheries and Oceans. McLaughlin joined government service in 1972. Since 1994 she has concentrated on the ecology of the Arctic Ocean.

Education and career 
McLauglin earned an M.Sc. from the University of Victoria in 1996 with a thesis titled "Geochemical and physical water mass properties and halocarbon ventilation in the Southern Canadian Basin of the Arctic Ocean". In 2000, she finished her Ph.D. from the University of Victoria.

McLaughlin has an extensive list of publications.

McLaughlin has made field trips on the icebreakers of the Canadian Coast Guard. In November 2009 she was one of the authors of an article in Science about the acidification of the Arctic Ocean that reported that the Beaufort Sea was close to the point where the carbonate shells of plankton would begin to dissolve.

Publications
Articles

Cruise reports

References

Canadian oceanographers
Year of birth missing (living people)
Living people
University of Victoria alumni
Women oceanographers